Phyllonorycter latus is a moth of the family Gracillariidae. It is probably widespread throughout the western United States, but only known from Inyo County in California and Grand and Alamosa counties in Colorado.

The length of the forewings is 3.7-4.4 mm. Adults are on wing in August in one generation.

The larvae feed on Populus tremuloides. They mine the leaves of their host plant.

Etymology
The specific name is derived from the Latin latus (broad) in reference to relatively broad vinculum, the most diagnostic feature of this species.

References

latus
Moths of North America
Moths described in 2001